RFA Oakol (A300) was a coastal tanker of the Royal Fleet Auxiliary. She was launched on 28 August 1946. She served until being decommissioned in February 1965, and then served briefly as a food storage ship. She was scrapped at Ghent from 14 November 1969 onwards.

References

Tankers of the Royal Fleet Auxiliary
1946 ships